Max Mirnyi and Mikhail Youzhny were the defending champions, but Mirnyi did not participate this year.  Youzhny partnered Marat Safin, losing in the first round.

Fabrice Santoro and Nenad Zimonjić won the title, defeating František Čermák and Jaroslav Levinský 6–1, 7–5 in the final.

Seeds

Draw

External links
 2006 Kremlin Cup Men's Doubles Draw

Kremlin Cup
Kremlin Cup